Eton most commonly refers to Eton College, a public school in Eton, Berkshire, England.

Eton may also refer to:

Places
Eton, Berkshire, a town in Berkshire, England
Eton, Georgia, a town in the United States
Éton, a commune in the Meuse department in France
Eton, Queensland, a town in Australia
Eton Rural District, a former rural district in the administrative county of Buckinghamshire, England
Eton Urban District, a former urban district in the administrative county of Buckinghamshire, England
North Eton, Queensland, a locality in Australia

Education
Eton College (Vancouver), a school in Vancouver, British Columbia, Canada
Eton Group, a group of British independent schools
Eton Academy, Birmingham, Michigan, USA
Eton School (Mexico), Mexico City, Mexico
Marion Military Institute, known as "American Eton" or "Eton of the South"
Rossall School described as an "Eton of the North"
Fettes College described as an "Eton of the North"
Glenalmond College described as an "Eton of the North"
The Doon School, described as the "Eton of India"
Bishop Cotton Boys' School, described as an "Eton of the East"
St. Paul's School, Darjeeling, described as an "Eton of the East"
London Academy of Excellence, described as the "Eton of the East End"
Ampleforth College, described as a "Catholic Eton"
The Oratory School, described as a "Catholic Eton"
Beaumont College, described as a "Catholic Eton"
Holland Park School, described as the "Socialist Eton"

People
Eton (surname), includes list of people with the name
Beti-Pahuin or Eton, an ethnic group inhabiting the Lekié division of central Cameroon 
Eton language, language spoken by them

Politics
Eton and Castle, an electoral ward in Berkshire, England comprising the town of Eton and Windsor Castle

Other
Etón Corporation, a US-based importer and manufacturer of shortwave radios
Eton mess, a traditional English dessert
Eton collar, a shirt collar fashionable in the late 19th and early 20th century, worn outside of the outer coat
Eton suit, a boys' suit with a full-buttoned short coat and short trousers, once part of the attire of Eton College
"The Eton Rifles", the first song by The Jam to reach the top ten in the UK charts
Eton Shirts, a Swedish men's shirt brand
Eton Centris, a development in Quezon City, Philippines

See also
Eaton (disambiguation)

Language and nationality disambiguation pages